Nicholas David Leimu-Brown (born 4 December 1962) is a British botanist and academic. Since 2010, he has been Principal of Linacre College, Oxford. He is also a Commonwealth Scholarship Commissioner.

Early life and education
Leimu-Brown was born on 4 December 1962 in Brockworth, Gloucestershire, England. He completed the International Baccalaureate at UWC Atlantic College in Wales from 1979 to 1981. He then studied geography at the University of Cambridge (Churchill College) between 1982 – 1985 and then an MSc in ecology at the University of Aberdeen. From 1986 to 1990 he studied for a DPhil in Forest Ecology under the supervision of Timothy Charles Whitmore at the University of Oxford (Linacre College). His thesis was entitled "Dipterocarp regeneration in tropical rain forest gaps of different sizes". He has also completed a diploma in Learning and Teaching in Higher Education.

Career and research 
Leimu-Brown was a lecturer at Manchester University from 1989 and then from 1992 to 2010 he was a lecturer in forestry at the University of Oxford.

In 2010 he took office as the fourth principal of Linacre College, Oxford.

Since 2014 he has been a Commonwealth Scholarship Commissioner acting as chair of awards policy committee.

Since 2015 he has been the chair of the University of Oxford buildings and estates sub-committee and serves on the planning and resource allocation committee of council. He also chairs the Radcliffe Observatory Quarter and the Science Area Advisory Boards.

Personal life 
Leimu-Brown is married to Dr Roosa Leimu-Brown, a yoga therapist, movement educator and dance artist with a PhD in biology, affiliated with the Department of Plant Sciences, University of Oxford. Nick Leimu-Brown's hobbies include sailing.

References

Living people
British botanists
Academics of the University of Oxford
Fellows of Linacre College, Oxford
Principals of Linacre College, Oxford
1962 births
People educated at Atlantic College
Alumni of Churchill College, Cambridge
Alumni of Linacre College, Oxford
People from Brockworth, Gloucestershire